The 2008 North Dakota Republican presidential caucuses took place on February 5, 2008. Romney won with 8 of the 23 national delegates.

Results

See also
 2008 North Dakota Democratic presidential caucuses
 2008 Republican Party presidential primaries

References

North Dakota
2008 North Dakota elections
2008
2008 Super Tuesday